Treasure Island is a 1918 American silent adventure film based on the 1883 novel of the same name by Robert Louis Stevenson. This is one of many silent versions of the story and is noteworthy because it is almost entirely acted by child or teenage actors. The film was co-directed by brothers Sidney and Chester Franklin. The film is one of Fox's Sunset Kiddies productions following in the wake of previous Kiddie productions like Aladdin and his Wonderful Lamp. This is a lost film.

Plot
As described in a film magazine, Jim Hawkins (Carpenter) and his mother operate the Admiral Ben Bow Inn, and when they are threatened by an attack by pirates they go to the home of their friend, the squire, for the night. Mrs. Hawkins (Washington) hands the squire a package she found in a chest that was owned by Billy Bones, one of her boarders who had died. The squire discovers a map showing the location of treasure buried by someone named Flint. Jim, overhearing the squire's plans to recover the treasure, goes to sleep and dreams that he, Louise (Corbin), and a ship's crew have set out to find the gold. Long John Silver (Radcliffe), their first mate, is a crook and with some of the men plan to rob Jim and Louise of the treasure. After a fight on the island and the killing off of Long John Silver's men, Long John Silver joins Jim and his gang and through Ben Gunn (Sargent) they find the treasure. Just as Jim is about to distribute it, he wakes up.

Cast
 Francis Carpenter as Jim Hawkins
 Virginia Lee Corbin as Louise Trelawney
 Violet Radcliffe as Long John Silver
 Lloyd Perl as Black Dog
 Lew Sargent as Ben Gunn
 Buddy Messinger as Captain Smollett
 Gertrude Messinger
 Eleanor Washington as Jim's mother
 Herschell Mayal as Captain Bill Bones (prologue)
 Elmo Lincoln as Long John Silver (prologue)
 Charles Gorman as Black Dog (prologue)
 Ed Harley (Edwin Harley) as Blind Pew (prologue)

References

External links

 

1918 films
American silent feature films
Fox Film films
Lost American films
Treasure Island films
Films directed by Sidney Franklin
1918 adventure films
American adventure films
Films directed by Chester Franklin
American black-and-white films
1918 lost films
Lost adventure films
1910s American films
Silent adventure films
1910s English-language films